Wiktor Hoechsmann (17 July 1894 – 29 June 1977) was a Polish cyclist. He competed in two events at the 1924 Summer Olympics.

References

External links
 

1894 births
1977 deaths
Polish male cyclists
Olympic cyclists of Poland
Cyclists at the 1924 Summer Olympics
People from Wieliczka County
Sportspeople from Lesser Poland Voivodeship